HMAS Bandolier (P 95) was an  of the Royal Australian Navy (RAN).

Design and construction

The Attack class was ordered in 1964 to operate in Australian waters as patrol boats (based on lessons learned through using the s on patrols of Borneo during the Indonesia-Malaysia Confrontation, and to replace a variety of old patrol, search-and-rescue, and general-purpose craft. Initially, nine were ordered for the RAN, with another five for Papua New Guinea's Australian-run coastal security force, although another six ships were ordered to bring the class to twenty vessels. Propulsion machinery consisted of two 16-cylinder Paxman YJCM diesel engines, which supplied  to the two propellers. The ship's company consisted of three officers and sixteen sailors. Main armament was a bow-mounted Bofors 40 mm gun, supplemented by two .50 calibre M2 Browning machine guns and various small arms. The ships were designed with as many commercial components as possible: the Attacks were to operate in remote regions of Australia and New Guinea, and a town's hardware store would be more accessible than home base in a mechanical emergency.

Bandolier was built by Walkers Limited at Maryborough, Queensland, launched on 2 October 1968 and commissioned on 14 December 1968.

Operational history
Bandolier paid off on 16 November 1973. She was transferred to the Indonesian Navy and renamed KRI Sibarau (847). The patrol boat was listed in Jane's Fighting Ships was still operational in 2011. In December 2017 the vessel sank while on patrol in the North Sumatra sea at 03.45.38 North - 098.57.55 East. The cause was not known but there were no casualties among the crew.

Citations

References
 
 
 

Attack-class patrol boats
Ships built in Queensland
1968 ships
Patrol vessels of the Royal Australian Navy
Patrol vessels of the Indonesian Navy
Maritime incidents in 2017
December 2017 events in Asia